Here's the Answer is the second studio album by American country artist Skeeter Davis. The album was released in January 1961 on RCA Victor Records and was produced by Chet Atkins. The album consisted of cover versions of hit singles by country artists and answer songs to the hits.

Background and content 
Here's the Answer was recorded at the RCA Victor Studio in Nashville, Tennessee, United States in three sessions. The first session took place May 13, 1960, followed by a session October 11, and then ending in December of that year. Like Davis' previous release, she harmonized with herself on the recordings in order to give her voice and the production a fuller sound. The album consisted of cover versions of major hit singles by country artists on the RCA Victor label, followed by Davis' answer song to the hit. It included the original versions of hits by artists such as Jim Reeves' "He'll Have to Go", Floyd Cramer's "Last Date", and Hank Locklin's "Please Help Me, I'm Falling". In response, Davis sings the answer songs; "He'll Have to Stay", "My Last Date (With You)", and "(I Can't Help You) I'm Falling Too". Richie Unterberger of Allmusic called the concept behind the album to be "hokey". Unterberger explained that half of the album wasn't "Davis at all", but instead the original versions of the song by the original artists are included. Unterberger gave the release only two out of five stars, stating, "It gets really ridiculous when Davis sings an answer song ("My Last Date") to Floyd Cramer's instrumental hit "Last Date." Davis' songs are okay mainstream country/pop; a couple of them ("(I Can't Help You) I'm Falling Too" and "My Last Date") were even Top 40 pop hits. But alternating her tracks bang-bang with hits by various other male country stars makes for a rather herky-jerky listening experience."

Here's the Answer was released as an LP record, and contained six songs on each side of the record. The album was reissued on a compact disc in the mid 1990s and added the four additional bonus tracks Davis recorded as duets with Bobby Bare and Porter Wagoner in the 1960s; "A Little Bitty Tear" with Porter Wagoner, "Have I Told You Lately That I Love You" with Porter Wagoner, "A Dear John Letter" with Bobby Bare, and "We'll Sing in the Sunshine" with Bobby Bare.

Release 
Here's the Answer spawned two singles in 1960. The first single released was Davis' response to Hank Locklin's "Please Help Me, I'm Falling" called, "(I Can't Help You) I'm Falling Too". The single was released in July 1960 and peaked for three weeks at #2 on the Billboard Magazine Hot Country Songs chart and became her first single to cross over to the Billboard Hot 100, reaching #39. The second single was released in December 1960 called, "My Last Date (With You)". The song reached #5 on the Billboard Magazine Hot Country Songs, while also reaching the Top 40 on the Billboard Hot 100 in 1961.  The songs became her second and third Top 10 hits as a solo artist. Here's the Answer was officially released in January 1961, but did not chart any Billboard list.

Track listing

Personnel 
 Chet Atkins – guitar
 Jerry Byrd – bass
 Floyd Cramer – piano
 Skeeter Davis – harmony vocals, background vocals, lead vocals
 Jimmy Day – steel guitar
 Hank Garland – guitar
 Buddy Harman – drums
 Bud Issac – steel guitar
 Anita Kerr Singers – background vocals
 Grady Martin – guitar
 Bob Moore – bass
 Velma Smith – rhythm guitar

Sales chart positions 
Singles

References 

1961 albums
Skeeter Davis albums
Albums produced by Chet Atkins
RCA Victor albums